A warg (an anglicised form of Old Norse vargr) is a fictional demonic species of wolves created by J.R.R. Tolkien.

Warg or WARG may also refer to:

 Warg, Afghanistan, a village
 WARG, a radio station in Summit, Illinois, US

People with the surname
 Cajsa Warg (1703–1769), Swedish cookbook author
 Fredrik Warg (born 1979), Swedish ice hockey player
 Per Gottfrid Svartholm Warg or Gottfrid Svartholm (born 1984), Swedish computer specialist and co-founder of The Pirate Bay
 Stefan Warg (born 1990), Swedish ice hockey player

See also
 Varg (disambiguation)
 WORG (disambiguation)